Movlazada Mahammad Hasan Ismayil oglu Shakavi was a noble Azerbaijani religious leader, alim and scholar who was the sixth Sheikh ul-Islam (Islamic Leader) of the Caucasus and the first scholar who translated Quran into the Azerbaijani language and provided detailed commentary and interpretation.

Early life
Mahammad Hasan was born in 1854. He received his first religious education at Shaki mollakhane, which he later continued at Ganja Madrasa. After graduation from madrasah he served for a few years as mullah (mosque leaders) of Ganja Jum'a mosque. He later decided to continue his education and for this purpose traveled to Iraq where he advanced his degree in religion studies.

Career
In 1891 he returned to the Caucasus and published the first joint Hijri and Gregorian calendars in Persian.

In 1893 Mahammad Hasan Movlazada started teaching Islamic religious law (Shariat and Fiqh) at Tiflis Muslim Religious Scholl. He later served as Ghazi of Jabrayil, Ganja, Tiflis and Kutaisi regions.

In 1908 Mahammad Hasan Movlazada had been elected as the sixth Sheikh ul-Islam of Muslims of the Caucasus.
 
In 1908 in Tiflis he publishes Kitab al-bayan fi tafsir al-Quran - the two-volume edition of Koran's translation and tafsir (commentary). This work has been re-published in Baku in 1990.

Movlazada Mahammad Hasan Ismayil oglu Shakavi died in 1932 in Tbilisi.

References

Azerbaijani Shia clerics
People from Shaki, Azerbaijan
Azerbaijani Shia Muslims
1854 births
1932 deaths
Translators of the Quran into Azerbaijani
Azerbaijani nobility